Stephen Wilkins (born 31 August 1959) is an English retired footballer who played as a midfielder in the Football League for Brentford. After his release in 1978, he embarked on a long career in non-League football and made a return to professional play for a brief period with Peterborough United in 1985. He is a member of the Wilkins football family, with his father George and brothers Ray, Dean and Graham also being former professional footballers.

Career
Wilkins began his career as an apprentice at Chelsea and departed in 1978 without making a senior appearance. He joined Third Division club Brentford on trial during the 1978–79 pre-season and made his Football League debut early in the regular season. He departed Griffin Park a short time afterwards and embarked on a career in non-League football, playing for Dagenham, Walthamstow Avenue, Ruislip Manor, Hayes, Chesham United and Hendon. While with Isthmian League Premier Division club Hendon, Wilkins moved to Fourth Division club Peterborough United on non-contract terms in early 1985. He made one appearance for the club, which came in a 2–0 Football League Trophy Southern Section first round second leg defeat to rivals Cambridge United on 5 February. He later played for Farnborough Town, Ruislip Manor (second spell), Staines Town and Walton & Hersham. He also had a spell playing in New Zealand.

Honours 
Hendon
 Middlesex Senior Charity Cup: 1984–85

Career statistics

References

English footballers
Brentford F.C. players
English Football League players
Living people
Chelsea F.C. players
Dagenham F.C. players
Walthamstow Avenue F.C. players
Association football midfielders
Tokyngton Manor F.C. players
Hayes F.C. players
Chesham United F.C. players
Hendon F.C. players
Peterborough United F.C. players
Farnborough F.C. players
Staines Town F.C. players
Walton & Hersham F.C. players
Isthmian League players
1959 births
Footballers from Hillingdon
Stephen